Paul Ryan (born Christopher Paul Ryan; 30 December 1952 – 26 July 2022) was a Welsh film reviewer,. historian and jazz singer.

Career
In 1978 Ryan moved to London and worked as a freelance film reviewer for The Guardian, The Observer and The Irish Times specialising in The Cinema of France, and as a commentator on erotic photography. He has interviewed over 150 actors, directors, producers and writers, such as Catherine Deneuve, Arnaud Desplechin, Jeanne Moreau, Philippe Noiret and Daniel Auteuil  for the Institut Français and the British Film Institute, hosted the Institut Français Royaume-Uni's Ciné Lumière cinema, translated the American crime television series Columbo into French, and been awarded the Chevalier (Knight) (1996) and Officier (Officer) (2010) of the Ordre des Arts et des Lettres for significant contributions to French arts and literature by the French Ministers for Culture Jacques Chirac and Nicolas Sarkozy, presented in London by the French Ambassador to the UK, Maurice Gourdault-Montagne.

Music 
From 2005, Ryan made a name as a jazz singer and "crooner" specialising in the Great American Songbook working with long-time friend, Musical Director and composer Kenny Clayton and jazz pianist and songwriter Jamie Safir. The London Evening Standard wrote that “all these kiddy-crooners around today think they’ve got the Sinatra touch but, believe me, they’re not fit to shine Paul’s patent-leather shoes”. Later in life, as a musician and socialite he earned himself a reputation as one of the best storytellers in Soho as illustrated in his last interview with Ian Shaw recorded for the Ronnie Scott's Radio Show, Jazz FM

Personal life
Ryan died on July 26, 2022.  He had a wife and a son from a previous relationship.

Bibliography

Discography
 2017 Blame It On My Youth: Paul Ryan and Kenny Clayton (recorded live at The Pheasantry)
 2022 Love Look Away: Paul Ryan & Jamie Safir

References 

British male jazz musicians

1952 births
2022 deaths
British jazz singers
British film historians
Officiers of the Ordre des Arts et des Lettres
British film critics
Singers from London
Writers from Cardiff
Writers from London
Musicians from Cardiff